The Sea-Bow International Sea-Bow is a Canadian powered parachute, designed by Gerald Racicot and produced by Sea-Bow International, formerly called Valmecot Inc, of Valcourt, Quebec.

The aircraft was introduced in 2000 and production ended when the company went out of business in 2015.

Design and development
The aircraft was designed to comply with the Canadian Basic Ultra-Light Aeroplane rules. It features a parachute-style high-wing, single-place accommodation, with a second seat optional, tricycle landing gear and a single  Rotax 503 engine in pusher configuration. The  Rotax 582 engine is a factory option. Before it went out of production the  Rotax 618 engine was also an option.

The Sea-Bow is built from a combination of bolted 6061-T6 aluminium and 4130 steel tubing. In flight steering is accomplished via dual control sticks that actuate the canopy brakes, creating roll and yaw. The aircraft is turned right by pulling the right stick and left by pulling the left stick. On the ground the aircraft has lever-controlled nosewheel steering. The throttle control is located on the right stick. A number of canopies are available, including the El-Condor I, II and III eleven and thirteen cell models.

The Sea-Bow's most obvious unique feature is the fitting of four highly angled, saucer-shaped polyurethane wheels outboard of, and in addition to, the main wheels. These "spyros" provide stability on the ground and in flight and the company claims "the shape and the precise location and positioning of these wheels enable the Sea-Bow to safely land and take-off on different types of terrain and conditions such as grass, sand, gravel, asphalt, snow or ice". The aircraft can even be safely water-landed as the spyros provide adequate flotation. They also provide enough ground stability that crosswinds will not blow the vehicle over, but instead allow it to turn into the wind.

Specifications (Sea-Bow with El-Condor II wing)

References

External links
Official website archives on Archive.org
Photo of the Sea-Bow showing the Spyros fitted
Photo of the Sea-Bow with designer Gerry Racicot

1990s Canadian ultralight aircraft
Single-engined pusher aircraft
Powered parachutes